You're Sleeping Nicole is a 2014 Canadian drama film directed by Stéphane Lafleur. It was selected to be screened as part of the Directors' Fortnight section of the 2014 Cannes Film Festival. The film had a limited release (in Montreal) on 22 August 2014, followed by a general Quebec theatrical release on 29 August 2014. It was screened in the Contemporary World Cinema section at the 2014 Toronto International Film Festival.

The film stars Julianne Côté as Nicole, a young woman who is becoming increasingly disillusioned with her quiet small-town life over the course of a summer.

Reception
The film was included in the list of Canada's Top Ten feature films of 2014, selected by a panel of filmmakers and industry professionals organized by TIFF.

It has a Metacritic score of 79%.

Released in the United States under the title Tu Dors Nicole, the film garnered positive reviews in The New York Times and other publications, for an average rating of 7.9/10 at Rotten Tomatoes.

Awards
The film garnered six Canadian Screen Award nominations at the 3rd Canadian Screen Awards, including Best Picture, Best Director (Lafleur), Best Actress (Côté), Best Supporting Actor (Marc-André Grondin), Best Supporting Actress (Catherine St-Laurent) and Best Original Screenplay (Lafleur).

Tu Dors Nicole had nine Jutra Award nominations (the second-most of any film for 2014), winning for Best Sound (Sylvain Bellemare, Pierre Bertrand, and Bernard Gariépy Strobl) and Best Original Music (Rémi Nadeau-Aubin and Christophe Lamarche-Ledoux). 

The Vancouver Film Critics Circle named Tu Dors Nicole Best Canadian Film of 2014, and also honoured it for Best Actress in a Canadian Film (Côté) and Best Supporting Actor in a Canadian Film (Grondin).

The film was the winner of the Prix collégial du cinéma québécois in 2015.

Home video
Kino Lorber has announced a Blu-ray and DVD of Tu Dors Nicole, to be released on 27 October 2015.

Cast
 Marc-André Grondin as Rémi Gagnon
 Fanny Mallette as Mère de Martin
 Julianne Côté as Nicole Gagnon
 Francis La Haye as JF / batteur
 Catherine St-Laurent as Véronique Simard
 Simon Larouche as Pat / bassiste

References

External links
 
 

2014 films
2014 drama films
2010s French-language films
Canadian drama films
Films directed by Stéphane Lafleur
Canadian black-and-white films
French-language Canadian films
2010s Canadian films